In physics, the radiation length is a characteristic of a material, related to the energy loss of high energy particles electromagnetically interacting  with it.

Definition
In materials of high atomic number (e.g. W, U, Pu) the electrons of energies >~10 MeV predominantly lose energy 
by bremsstrahlung, and high-energy photons by  pair production. The characteristic
amount of matter traversed for these related interactions is called the radiation length ,
usually measured in g·cm−2. It is both the mean distance over which a high-energy
path for pair production by a high-energy photon. It is also the appropriate length scale for describing high-energy electromagnetic cascades.

The radiation length for a given material consisting of a single type of nucleus can be approximated by the following expression:

,

For , a good approximation is

,

where  is the number density of the nucleus,  denotes the reduced Planck constant,  the electron rest mass,  the speed of light, and  the fine-structure constant.

For electrons at lower energies (below few tens of MeV), the energy loss by ionization is predominant.

While this definition may also be used for other electromagnetic interacting particles beyond leptons and photons, the presence of the stronger hadronic and nuclear interaction makes it a far less interesting characterisation of the material; the nuclear collision length and nuclear interaction length are more relevant.

Comprehensive tables for radiation lengths and other properties of materials are available from the Particle Data Group.

See also
 Mean free path
 Attenuation length
 Attenuation coefficient
 Attenuation
 Range (particle radiation)
 Stopping power (particle radiation)
 Electron energy loss spectroscopy

References

Experimental particle physics